Femme Fatale is the thirteenth studio album by Japanese singer Akina Nakamori. It was released on 3 August 1988 under the Warner Pioneer label. The album consist mainly of western arrangers that evokes to the listeners the danceable melody line in western style, which was not so well common and popular in Japan during late 80s.

Background
Femme Fatale is third studio album released in year 1988, after two months from previous mini album Wonder.

The album consist of any previously released single and includes 10 new songs recorded. While the previous studio albums "Wonder" had relaxing and studio album "Stock" hard-rock melody line, this album has the main the danceable melody line.

The music production team consist of main music arranger, Kazuo Shiina (expect of track 10) who previously collaborated with Nakamori in the studio album Crimson. This album includes many western arrangers as Jon Lind, Joey Carbone and Mark Goldenberg; and musicians Peter Frampton, Michael Thompson and Steve Farris.

Two tracks were written by Qumico Fucci, who write for Nakamori single "Tattoo". Due to the unknown reasons, the single wasn't included in the album and instead released in the compilation album Best II. The album track "Reversion (Desire)" has been recorded with the Synclavier.

The album has been positively praised by the critics. Writer Yukiko Kitajima points out Nakamori's singing in the very sensual way.

In the weekly journal of Oricon Weekly Charts, the editors praised for Nakamori experimenting with the various vocal range performance, including shouting (La Liberte), sensual (Dakishimeteite) and whisper chanting (Femme Fatale).

Stage performances
In Fuji TV music television program Yoru no Hit Studio, Nakamori performed So Mad, Dakishimete and La Liberte. In Asahi TV music television program Music Station, Nakamori performed So Mad.

So Mad, Dakishimeteite and La Liberte  were performed in Nakamori's live tour Femme Fatale in 1988.

Charting performance
The album reached number 1 on the Oricon Weekly Album Charts and sold over 268,800 copies. The sales numbers makes Nakamori's the lowest sold album during her stay in the recording label Warner Pioneer. The album remained at number 30 on the Oricon Album Yearly Charts in 1988. It's Nakamori's second album (after Stock, #14), which remained in the Yearly Album Charts in 1988.

Track listing

References

1988 albums
Japanese-language albums
Akina Nakamori albums
Warner Music Japan albums